is an interchange passenger railway station located in the city of Musashino, Tokyo, Japan, operated by East Japan Railway Company (JR East) and the private railway company, Seibu Railway.

Lines
Musashi-Sakai Station is served by the JR East Chūō Main Line, and is also the northern terminus of the short Seibu Tamagawa Line. It is not a major transfer station, and only local (all-stations) trains on the Chūō Line stop at Musashi-Sakai.

JR East

Station layout
JR Musashi-Sakai Station has two elevated opposed side platforms serving two tracks, with the station building located underneath. The station has a Midori no Madoguchi staffed ticket office.

Platforms

Seibu

Station layout
The Seibu station has a single elevated dead-headed island platform serving two tracks, with the station building located underneath.

Platforms

History
The Tamagawa Line began operations on 22 October 1917. The station was renamed to its present name on 1 July 1919. The current station building was completed in 2008.

Surrounding area
The area around Musashi-sakai has the standard commercial activity common to suburban Tokyo train stations, with a branches of the Ito Yokado department store, JR-owned Hotel Mets, and the Tokyo-Mitsubishi UFJ Bank, as well as a shopping street with many restaurants and small shops on the north side. The station has the standard taxi rank and bus stops, servicing bus routes between there and Hibarigaoka Station on the Seibu Ikebukuro Line to the north and Chōfu Station on the Keiō Line to the south.

It is the nearest train station to International Christian University and the National Astronomical Observatory of Japan headquarters. Tama (formerly Tamabochimae), the second stop on the line, serves The American School in Japan, Nogawa Park, Tokyo University of Foreign Studies, and other institutions.

Passenger statistics
In fiscal 2019, the JR station was used by an average of 68,907 passengers daily (boarding passengers only) making it the 67th busiest JR East station. In the same fiscal year, the station was the busiest on the Seibu Tamagawa Line and the 32nd busiest on the Seibu network as a whole with an average of 30,854 passengers daily.

The passenger figures in previous years are as shown below. Note that the JR East figures only consider boarding passengers whereas the Seibu figures consider both entering and exiting passengers.

References

External links

 Seibu station information 
 JR East station information 

Railway stations in Tokyo
Railway stations in Japan opened in 1889
Seibu Tamagawa Line
Chūō Main Line
Musashino, Tokyo